The 2021–22 Big Ten men's ice hockey season is the 32nd season of play for the Big Ten Conference's men's ice hockey division and will take place during the 2021–22 NCAA Division I men's ice hockey season. The regular season is set to begin on October 2, 2021 and conclude on February 26, 2022. The conference tournament is scheduled to begin in early March, 2022.

Coaches

Records

Standings

Non-Conference record 
Of the sixteen teams that are selected to participate in the NCAA tournament, ten will be via at-large bids. Those 10 teams are determined based upon the PairWise rankings. The rankings take into account all games played but are heavily affected by intra-conference results. The result is that teams from leagues which perform better in non-conference are much more likely to receive at-large bids even if they possess inferior records overall.

As a conference, the Big Ten had a tremendous non-conference season. Only one of the seven league members (Wisconsin) had a losing record in non-league games. Four teams had at least an 80% winning percentage. On the whole, only one conference possessed a winning record against the Big Ten (NCHC), however, they did so by only one victory.

Regular season record

Statistics

Leading scorers 
GP = Games played; G = Goals; A = Assists; Pts = Points; PIM = Penalty minutes

Leading goaltenders 
Minimum 1/3 of team's minutes played in conference games.

GP = Games played; Min = Minutes played; W = Wins; L = Losses; T = Ties; GA = Goals against; SO = Shutouts; SV% = Save percentage; GAA = Goals against average

Conference tournament 

Note: * denotes overtime periods.
Note: * denotes overtime periods.

NCAA tournament

Regional semifinal

Midwest

Northeast

East

Regional final

Midwest

Northeast

East

National semifinal

Ranking

USCHO

USA Today

Pairwise 

Note: teams ranked in the top-10 automatically qualify for the NCAA tournament. Teams ranked 11-16 can qualify based upon conference tournament results.

Awards

NCAA

Big Ten

Big Ten tournament

2022 NHL Entry Draft 

† incoming freshman

References

External links 
official website

2021–22 Big Ten men's ice hockey season
Big Ten
2021–22